Jahangiri Mahal may be the most noteworthy building inside the Agra Fort of India. The Mahal was the principal zenana (palace for women belonging to the royal household), and was used by the Rajput wives of Akbar. It is a form of Islamic architecture .

History
The palace was built by Akbar for his Hindu wives. It is one of the earliest surviving buildings of Akbar's reign. Jahangir in his memoirs stated that the buildings were erected by his father Akbar but did not take any credit for the construction of Jahangiri palace or Mahal. During the reign of Jahangir, it is believed to be the residence of his wife, Jagat Gosain, the Princess of Marwar and mother of  Mughal emperor Shah Jahan.  

There is a huge bowl called Hauz-i-Jahangiri that is carved out of a single piece of stone. This was used as a container for fragrant rose water.

See also
Moti Masjid, Agra
Jodha Bai Mahal
Shah Jahani Mahal

References

External links

Photos of Jahangiri Mahal

Agra Fort